Sphaeroplea is a genus of green algae in the family Sphaeropleaceae.

References

External links

Sphaeropleales genera
Sphaeropleales